Preston is a village and civil parish in the county of Rutland in the East Midlands of England. It lies north of Uppingham on the A6003 to Oakham. The population at the 2001 census was 179 falling slightly to 173 at the 2011 census.

The village's name means 'farm/settlement of the priests'.

The Church of St Peter and St Paul, Preston is a Grade II* listed building.

References

External links

Villages in Rutland
Civil parishes in Rutland